Otter is an infrastructure automation tool, designed by the software company Inedo. Built specifically to support Windows, Otter utilizes Infrastructure as Code to model infrastructure  and configuration.

Otter provisions and configure servers automatically, without logging in to a command prompt.

Key areas
Otter focuses on two key areas:
 Configuration Automation - Otter allows users to model the configuration of servers, roles, and environments; monitor for drift, schedule changes, and ensure consistency across servers 
 Orchestration Automation - Otter can spin up cloud servers, build containers, deploy packages, patch servers, or any other multi-server/service automation 

Otter also has drift monitoring capabilities. It can continuously monitor for server configuration drift, can automatically remediate drift, and can send notification when drift occurs.

Key features
Otter has a visual, web-based user interface that is designed to "create complex configurations and orchestrations using the intuitive, drag-and-drop editor, and then switch to-and-from code/text mode as needed." Otter aims to enable DevOps practices through its UI, and shows the configuration state of an organization's servers infrastructure (local, virtual, cloud-built). Otter has first-class Windows support and supports Linux-based operating systems through SSH based agents. 

Otter monitors servers for configuration changes, and reports when the configuration has drifted. Otter supports both agent and agent-less windows servers.

Beginning in Version 1.5 Otter integrates with Atlassian Jira and Git. This functionality is enabled through extensions.

PowerShell

A key feature of Otter is the Windows PowerShell integration. As a tool designed with "first-class" Windows support, this feature allows users to leverage their existing scripts and scripts built by the Windows PowerShell community.

See also 
Ansible
Chef
 Puppet
 Configuration Management
 Continuous configuration automation
 DevOps toolchain

References

Orchestration software
Configuration management